Genesis is an album by American jazz drummer Elvin Jones recorded in 1971 and released on the Blue Note label. It features Jones in a quintet with saxophonists Joe Farrell, Frank Foster and Dave Liebman, and bassist Gene Perla.

Reception
The Allmusic review by Scott Yanow awarded the album 4 stars stating "Elvin Jones' band had expanded during 1969-71 from a pianoless trio to a three-horn quintet... it would not be an overstatement to call this a powerful unit... the musicians take long, heated solos that straddle the boundary between hard bop and the avant-garde. Their album has plenty of invigorating music".

Track listing
 "P.P. Phoenix" (Gene Perla) - 5:00
 "For All the Other Times" (Perla) - 10:07
 "Slumber" (Dave Liebman) - 5:32
 "Three Card Molly" (Elvin Jones) - 8:27
 "Cecilia Is Love (Frank Foster) - 10:06

Personnel
Elvin Jones - drums
Joe Farrell, Dave Liebman - tenor saxophone, soprano saxophone
Frank Foster - tenor saxophone, alto flute, alto clarinet
Gene Perla - bass, electric bass

References

Blue Note Records albums
Elvin Jones albums
1971 albums
Albums recorded at Van Gelder Studio
Albums produced by George Butler (record producer)
Albums produced by Francis Wolff